Falla is a locality situated in Finspång Municipality, Östergötland County, Sweden with 467 inhabitants in 2010.

References

External links

Populated places in Östergötland County
Populated places in Finspång Municipality